Hypotia saramitoi is a species of snout moth in the genus Hypotia. It was described by Christian Guillermet in 1996 and is known from Réunion.

References

Moths described in 1996
Lepidoptera of Réunion
Pyralinae
Moths of Réunion
Endemic fauna of Réunion